Avrig Lake is a glacial lake situated in the Făgăraș Mountains of Romania, in the northeastern corner of Vâlcea County.

It is the origin of the Avrig River.

From a tourist's point of view, Avrig Lake is halfway between Suru Chalet and Negoiu Chalet.

Notes

Photo gallery

External links 

Lakes of Romania
Glacial lakes
Geography of Vâlcea County